Tosa Kokubun-ji is a Shingon Buddhist Temple located in Nankoku, Kōchi, Japan. It is the 29th temple of the Shikoku Pilgrimage.

References 

Buddhist pilgrimage sites in Japan
Buddhist temples in Kōchi Prefecture
Kōyasan Shingon temples